Roy A. Cheville (October 2, 1897–April 6, 1986) was a religious leader, theologian and educator in the Reorganized Church of Jesus Christ of Latter Day Saints (RLDS Church), which became Community of Christ in 2001. Cheville graduated from Graceland University in 1921 with an Associate of Arts (A.A.) degree in liberal arts and religious education. In 1926, he authored Graceland's Alma Mater Hymn while on the faculty.  He obtained his Ph. B. in 1922, an A.M in Divinity in 1923, a D.B. in Practical Theology in 1925, and later a Ph.D. in religion in 1942, all from the University of Chicago. He was the first member of his denomination to complete a doctoral level religious education.

Cheville was regarded as an influential professor of Religion at Graceland from 1923 to 1960 and also served as the campus pastor. Cheville taught many introductory religion courses from his own text, “Growing Up In Religion” stressing that a view of God restricted to scriptural and doctrinal traditions was too small and confining.

Cheville was called to the office of Presiding Patriarch in the RLDS Church in 1958 by W. Wallace Smith and was the first person to serve in that office who was not a direct descendant of Joseph Smith In that role, he presided over the Order of Evangelists, which had 89 members at that time. He authored more than 345 articles, 20 pamphlets and 25 books on Christian family life, spirituality, church history, theology, scriptures, and other religious topics. He was an authority on the subject of religious socialization, but his position at Graceland University and later as Presiding Patriarch provided him with a platform from which he could be heard on a wide variety of subjects. His 1962 text “Did the Light Go Out?” represented a turn away from the traditional RLDS viewpoint regarding the Great Apostasy. He wrote numerous hymn texts published in Hymns of the Saints and prior hymnals, including “Afar in Old Judea” and had a reputation as a vigorous song leader and a self-styled humorist. The Cheville Chapel at Graceland University is named in his honor.

Hymns by Roy Cheville

Books by Roy Cheville

Notes

1897 births
1986 deaths
20th-century American educators
American Latter Day Saint hymnwriters
American theologians
Graceland University alumni
Graceland University faculty
Presiding Evangelists of the Community of Christ
University of Chicago Divinity School alumni
Doctrine and Covenants people
American leaders of the Community of Christ
People from Story County, Iowa
20th-century American musicians